Calice Ligure ( or ) is a comune (municipality) in the Province of Savona in the Italian region Liguria, located about  southwest of Genoa and about  southwest of Savona.

Calice Ligure borders the following municipalities: Bormida, Finale Ligure, Mallare, Orco Feglino, Rialto, and Tovo San Giacomo.

References

External links
 Official website

Cities and towns in Liguria